Nikita Yuryevich Drozdov (born 21 April 1992) is a Russian football midfielder. He plays for Sakhalinets Moscow.

Club career
He made his debut in the Russian Second Division for FC Sakhalin Yuzhno-Sakhalinsk on 15 July 2012 in a game against FC Baikal Irkutsk. He made his Russian Football National League debut for Sakhalin on 6 July 2014 in a game against FC Anzhi Makhachkala.

He made his Russian Premier League debut for FC Tambov on 26 February 2021 in a game against FC Rotor Volgograd. He started in a 1–3 home loss.

Personal life
His father Yuri Drozdov is a football coach and a former player, and his younger brother Ilya Drozdov is also a footballer.

References

External links
 
 
 

1992 births
Footballers from Moscow
Living people
Russian footballers
Association football midfielders
Russian expatriate footballers
Expatriate footballers in Belarus
FC Sakhalin Yuzhno-Sakhalinsk players
FC Torpedo-BelAZ Zhodino players
PFC Spartak Nalchik players
FC Shinnik Yaroslavl players
FC Chayka Peschanokopskoye players
FC Fakel Voronezh players
FC Tambov players
FC Amkar Perm players
Belarusian Premier League players
Russian Premier League players